First Kuril Strait (also known as just Kuril Strait) is a strait, located at , separating the Shumshu Island of the Kuril Islands from the Cape Lopatka, Kamchatka Peninsula.

See also
 Second Kuril Strait
 Fourth Kuril Strait

Straits of the Kuril Islands
Shumshu
Bodies of water of the Kamchatka Peninsula